The Columbia University Science Honors Program (SHP) is a science program at Columbia University that runs during the school year for tenth-, eleventh-, and twelfth-grade high-school students.

Curriculum
Since 1958, SHP has offered courses spanning the full range of the pure and applied sciences, from organic chemistry, neuroscience and physiological psychology, to computer programming in Java and calculus in the complex plane, as well as introductions to special relativity, quantum theory, particle physics and physical cosmology. The program was directed by educator Donald Barr from its inception until 1964, and during that period admitted students as young as ten years old. It boasts many famous alumni, including the creator of GNU, Richard Stallman, and several Nobel Laureates. The program was run by Professor Allan Blaer for many years, and has recently been taken over by Professor Jeremy Dodd.

Administration
Classes are held each Saturday throughout the academic year, from September through May at Pupin Hall at Columbia University. 
There are no tuition charges for the program, but students must provide their own transportation expenses, to and from Columbia's campus in New York City. The program receives funding from the university, and donations from corporations and foundations, as well individual donations from students.

Admission
To apply to the SHP, students must go online to the Columbia SHP website; however, this was not the procedure in 1958 when the program started. The main portion of the application process is a rigorous, three-hour examination proctored in the Columbia University campus that contains questions in both mathematics and science.  The exam is tripartite, consisting of a 50 question "easy" mathematics section, a 75 question survey science section, and a 15 question "challenge" mathematics section. The average acceptance rate for the program is usually around 10%.  There are 300-400 participants in the program across all 3 grades (10,11,12).

Applications are mailed to schools within a 75-mile radius of Columbia's New York City campus, and there are several more requirements besides the test:  A transcript of the student's grades, a recommendation by a science or math teacher, and a student essay are also required.

References

Gifted education
Columbia University